Susan-e Sharqi Rural District is a rural district (dehestan) in Susan District, Izeh County, Khuzestan Province, Iran. At the 2006 census, its population was 5,517, in 965 families.  The rural district has 29 villages.

References 

Rural Districts of Khuzestan Province
Izeh County